Dunaújváros Stadion is a multi-use stadium in Dunaújváros, Hungary, with a capacity of 12,000. It is currently used mostly for football matches and is the home of football club Dunaújváros Pálhalma.

History
On 23 March 2002, the stadium was inaugurated by the Dunaújváros-Debrecen in the 2001–02 season of the Hungarian League.

In 2009 the one-time Hungarian League champion, Dunaújváros FC dissolved.

Milestone matches

References

External links
Stadium Eszperantó út at magyarfutball.hu

Football venues in Hungary